The Socialist Party of France – Jean Jaurès Union (PSdF) was a political party in France founded in 1933 during the late Third Republic which united the right-wing of the French Section of the Workers' International (SFIO). The PSdF was formed by neosocialist members of the SFIO expelled from the party in 1933. These included Marcel Déat, Paul Ramadier and Adrien Marquet. The party was weak and merged with the Republican-Socialist Party and the French Socialist Party to form the Socialist Republican Union (USR) in 1935. The USR participated in the Popular Front.

References 

Defunct political parties in France
Political parties of the French Third Republic
Socialist parties in France
Jean Jaurès